Rock Springs is a city in Sweetwater County, Wyoming, United States. The population was 23,036 at the 2010 census, making it the fifth most populated city in the state of Wyoming, and the most populous city in Sweetwater County. Rock Springs is the principal city of the Rock Springs micropolitan statistical area, which has a population of 37,975. Rock Springs is known as the Home of 56 Nationalities because of the influx of immigrants from all over the world who came to work in the coal mines that supplied the fuel to power the steam engines of the Union Pacific Railroad. The city's rich cultural heritage is celebrated each summer on International Day, a festival where the foods, costumes, and traditions of residents' ancestors are recreated and enjoyed at Bunning Park in downtown Rock Springs.

Rock Springs is the site of Western Wyoming Community College and Wyoming's Big Show, a yearly event with a carnival and concerts which is held at the Sweetwater County Events Complex.

Rock Springs is located in an energy-rich region with many oil and natural gas wells.

History
Rock Springs derives its name from a rock spring which flowed in the Number 6 district in the northern part of town. An erroneous story had indicated that the spring was found by a lost Pony Express rider, but the spring station was known to Jim Bridger before 1860; the Overland Stage station was located nearby. The spring disappeared when the coal mine operations interrupted the underground flow. Later an 'S' was added to the name making it "Rock Springs".

Through the years, water supplies have been a problem to Rock Springs. In the early days, Ed Cleg hauled domestic water from the sulfur spring north of Rock Springs and charged $.25 a barrel. With the mining operations, the water flow was interrupted and water was hauled from Green River and Point of Rocks. Beginning in 1887, a water main was started from the Green River and completed in 1888 to bring a continuous supply of water to Rock Springs.

Rock Springs has a multi-ethnic heritage; locals called it the 57 Variety Town. The first immigrants were brought in by the railroad and coal mining companies. The Welsh and British people were initially most populous. Later, Irish, Blacks and refugees from the Southern part of the United States also came. The Scandinavian people were represented with a heavy Mormon recruitment.

One of the worst incidents of anti-immigrant violence in American history, known as the Rock Springs Massacre, occurred on September 2, 1885, whereby White miners slaughtered their Chinese counterparts due to anti-Chinese sentiment. There are still remains of the old coal mining towns outside of Rock Springs.

On June 10, 1892, Rock Springs National Bank opened on 515 S Main St, across from the Union Pacific depot. The original sandstone building was designed by Mayor H.H. Edgar who chose an Italianate style. In 1907, when John Hay Sr. assumed control of the business, the location moved to C Street. RSNB owned the original building until 1921 when it was sold to Anton Mengoni. Hay Sr. navigated the bank through the Great Depression and World War II, before retiring in 1947. John Hay Jr., his son, then took control of the bank, having to control wild growth during Wyoming's massive energy boom in the 1970s. Another of Hay Sr.'s sons was Archibald (Archie) Hay. Archibald was killed in France by a German plane in 1918. In his memory, Post 24 of the American Legion, chartered in 1919, was named Archie Hay Post.

Rock Springs was featured on 60 Minutes in 1977 due to corruption within the Police Department and City Government. A grand jury was called into session. The Sheriff of Sweetwater County, James Stark, testified and no wrongdoing was ever found. A follow up was filmed 20 years later for the show City Confidential. The episode was named "Rock Springs: Deadly Draw in the Wild West".

More about the history of Rock Springs can be found at the https://www.rswy.net/department/index.php?structureid=15.

Geography
Rock Springs is located at  (41.585106, –109.221392).

The city is approximately 6759 feet (2060 m) above sea level.

Climate
Rock Springs has a semi-arid climate (Köppen BSk) with cold, snowy winters and warm summers. Precipitation is usually light but has two peaks in mid spring and in early fall. Summer and winter are both drier.

There is an average of 61.7 days with measurable precipitation.

Demographics

2010 census
At the 2010 census, there were 23,036 people, 8,762 households and 5,849 families living in the city. The racial makeup of the city was 86.4% White, 1.4% African American, 0.8% Native American, 1.1% Asian, 0.1% Pacific Islander, 7.5% from other races, and 2.6% from two or more races. Hispanic or Latino of any race were 16.4% of the population.

There were 8,762 households, of which 35.8% had children under the age of 18 living with them, 49.9% were married couples living together, 9.8% had a female householder with no husband present, 7.1% had a male householder with no wife present, and 33.2% were non-families. 25.3% of all households were made up of individuals, and 6.6% had someone living alone who was 65 years of age or older. The average household size was 2.57 and the average family size was 3.07.

The median age in the city was 31.5 years. 26.4% of residents were under the age of 18; 11.4% were between the ages of 18 and 24; 29.4% were from 25 to 44; 24.6% were from 45 to 64; and 8.1% were 65 years of age or older. The gender makeup of the city was 52.1% male and 47.9% female.

2000 census
At the 2000 census, there were 18,708 people, 7,348 households and 4,930 families living in the city. The population density was 1,014.4 per square mile (391.7/km2). There were 8,359 housing units at an average density of 453.3 per square mile (175.0/km2). The racial makeup of the city was 91.75% White, 1.07% African American, 0.86% Native American, 1.02% Asian, 0.03% Pacific Islander, 3.05% from other races, and 2.22% from two or more races. Hispanic or Latino of any race were 8.96% of the population.

There were 7,348 households, of which 35.4% had children under the age of 18 living with them, 52.5% were married couples living together, 10.2% had a female householder with no husband present, and 32.9% were non-families. 27.4% of all households were made up of individuals, and 8.5% had someone living alone who was 65 years of age or older. The average household size was 2.48 and the average family size was 3.02.

27.1% of the population were under the age of 18, 11.2% from 18 to 24, 29.2% from 25 to 44, 22.5% from 45 to 64, and 9.9% who were 65 years of age or older. The median age was 34 years. For every 100 females, there were 99.2 males. For every 100 females age 18 and over, there were 98.2 males.

The median household income was $42,584 and the median family income was $51,541. Males had a median income of $44,809 compared with $22,609 for females. The per capita income for the city was $19,396. About 6.4% of families and 9.4% of the population were below the poverty line, including 11.0% of those under age 18 and 8.7% of those age 65 or over.

Education

Public education in the city of Rock Springs is provided by Sweetwater County School District #1. Schools serving the city include: Desert View Elementary, Lincoln Elementary, Northpark Elementary, Overland Elementary, Pilot Butte Elementary, Sage Elementary, Stagecoach Elementary, Walnut Elementary, Westridge Elementary, Eastside Elementary, Rock Springs Junior High School, and Rock Springs High School. There are also two alternative campuses – Black Butte High School, and Roosevelt Learning Center.

Rock Springs has two public libraries, Rock Springs Library and White Mountain Library, both of which are branches of the Sweetwater County Library System. The Rock Springs Library is also an original Carnegie Library, and has since been expanded to include an art gallery that is home to an original Norman Rockwell painting.

Transportation

Highways
Interstate Highways:

 I-80
 East-West Interstate running from California to New Jersey. Intersects US 191 northeast of Rock Springs.

US Routes:

 US 30 (Dewar Drive)
 East-West route through Rock Springs and business route

 US 191
 North-South through Rock Springs that intersects I-80

Wyoming State Highways:

 WYO 370 (Baxter Road/Airport Road)
 From Interstate 80 and U.S. 30 Exit 111 southeast to the Rock Springs Regional Airport. Signed only as "Airport Road" from the Interstate, with one sign indicating "Baxter Road".

 WYO 376 (Circumferential Highway/Rock Springs Beltway)
 Belt route around Rock Springs, splitting from and then meeting again with Business I-80 through Rock Springs

 WYO 430 (Hampshire Street Parkway)
 Stretch of road running south to the Colorado-Wyoming State Line near Hiawatha Camp, Colorado. The route continues south as an unimproved highway all the way to Colorado 318 near Dinosaur National Monument.

Airports
Rock Springs is served by Rock Springs-Sweetwater County Airport.

Railroads
Union Pacific serves Rock Springs.

Public transportation
STAR Transit provides local bus service in Rock Springs, with limited service to Reliance and Green River.

Sister city
Rock Springs' sister city is:
 Skofja Loka, Slovenia

Media

Hyperlocal websites
Rock Springs is served by two hyperlocal news websites, SweetwaterNOW.com and Wyo4news.com

Print
Rock Springs is served by two print publications: Rock Springs Daily Rocket-Miner and the Green River Star (a weekly newspaper published in Green River).

Radio
Rock Springs is served by a number of radio stations including KRKK, KSIT, KQSW, KMRZ-FM, KYCS, KZWB, KFRZ and KUGR.

Television
All television stations in Rock Springs are translators or satellites of stations located elsewhere:

All West Communications is the local cable television franchise serving Rock Springs; the system offers KGWC, Wyoming PBS and ABC affiliate KTWO-TV from Casper, plus most major stations from Salt Lake City. There are a couple of local Public-access television cable TV stations as well.

Entertainment

Every year during July, August, and September the city holds a county fair called Wyoming's Big Show. The event includes theme park rides, booths, restaurants and live entertainment. Rodeos have been a staple of the fair and famous performers are sometimes a part of the entertainment.

Rock Springs also hosts several festivals throughout the year, including the International Festival (to honor the city's nickname), the Blues and Brews Festival, the Wyoming Chocolate Festival and the Rod and Rails Festival.

Notable people
 Adam Archuleta, safety for St. Louis Rams and Chicago Bears
 Earl W. Bascom (1906–1995), rodeo champion, cowboy artist, Rodeo Hall of Fame cowboy, Hollywood actor, inventor lived with his brother in Rock Springs
 Texas Rose Bascom (1922–1993), rodeo performer, trick roper, Hollywood actress, National Cowgirl Hall of Fame inductee
 Paul Brothers, football player
 Ed Cantrell, accused of shooting undercover officer from Rock Springs Police Department
 Butch Cassidy, worked in Rock Springs in a butcher shop before becoming an infamous outlaw
 Bruce Collins (basketball), was drafted by the Portland Trail Blazers in the 1980 NBA Draft and played pro Basketball overseas
 Edward Crippa, U.S. Senator from Wyoming
 Mickey Daniels, actor who appeared in many movies in 1930s
 Boyd Dowler, wide receiver for Green Bay Packers (1959–1969) and Washington Redskins (1971)
 John Frullo, member of Texas House of Representatives from Lubbock, was reared in Rock Springs prior to 1980. His father is the architect John L. Frullo
 Paul Gosar, member of U.S. House of Representatives representing 
 Pete Gosar, brother of Paul Gosar and Democratic politician
 Robert Holding, launched first of Grand America Hotels & Resorts west of Rock Springs in 1952
 Joe Legerski, head coach of Wyoming Cowgirls basketball team
 Andrew Manatos, administrative assistant for US Senate Liaison to Presidents John F. Kennedy and Lyndon B. Johnson; responsible for passing historic Civil Rights Bills and other major legislation through Senate
 Florabel Muir, syndicated columnist, New York newspaper reporter and Hollywood screenwriter
 Teno Roncalio, Democratic politician, U.S. Representative 1965–1967 and again 1971–1978
 Jack Snow, wide receiver for Los Angeles Rams (1965–1975)
 J.J. Syvrud, football player
 John Wendling, football player for Buffalo Bills and Detroit Lions
Spencer West (born 1981), American motivational speaker and disability advocate

References

External links

 
 Rock Springs Photos (from Wyoming Tales and Trails)
 Rock Springs Chamber of Commerce

 
Cities in Wyoming
Cities in Sweetwater County, Wyoming
Coal towns in Wyoming
Micropolitan areas of Wyoming
1888 establishments in Wyoming Territory